"Prima Donna" is a song by British rock band Uriah Heep from their eighth studio album Return to Fantasy (1975), released as the first single from the album. The song was written by David Byron, Mick Box, Lee Kerslake and Ken Hensley. It was recorded in May 1975 in Lansdowne and Morgan Studios, London.  The song reached number ten in Denmark and number three in Norway.

Personnel
 David Byron – lead vocals
 Mick Box – guitar
 Ken Hensley – keyboards, backing vocals
 Lee Kerslake – drums, backing vocals
 John Wetton – bass, backing vocals

References

1975 songs
Uriah Heep (band) songs
Songs written by David Byron
Songs written by Mick Box
Songs written by Lee Kerslake
Songs written by Ken Hensley